Coralie is a French feminine given name meaning "coral", derived from the Latin word coralium. It was the eighth most popular name for baby girls in Quebec in 2007.

Notable people with the name include:
 Coralie Balmy (born 1987), French swimmer
 Coralie Blythe (1881–1928), was an English actress and singer born Caroline Maud Blyth
 Coralie Clément (born 1978), French singer
 Coralie van den Cruyce (1796–1858), Belgian writer, feminist and poet
 Coralie Franklin Cook (1861–1942), African-American educator, public speaker and government official
 Coralie Demay (born 1992), French racing cyclist
 Coralie Dubost (born 1983), French jurist and politician
 Coralie Fargeat (born 1976), French film director and screenwriter
 Coralie Lassource (born 1992), French handball player
 Coralie O'Connor (1934–2019), American swimmer
 Coralie Clarke Rees (1908–1972), Australian author
 Coralie Simmons (born 1977), American water polo player
 Coralie Frasse Sombet (born 1999), French alpine ski racer
 Coralie Winn, urban arts director

See also
 Coralee, another given name

References

French feminine given names
Given names derived from gemstones